The Smith River is a river in the Yukon Territory and the province of British Columbia, Canada, arising in the Yukon at  and crossing the border to enter British Columbia at  to its confluence with the Liard River at , between the confluences of the Toad and Coal Rivers.  At the confluence is the site of the former Hudson's Bay Company trading post, Fort Halkett, and also Smith River Falls, which are jointly protected by Smith River Falls-Fort Halkett Provincial Park.

The settlement of Smith River is located upstream at the confluence of Shaw Creek, and is the site of the third-coldest temperature on record in Canada.

See also
Smith River (disambiguation)
List of extreme temperatures in Canada

References

Rivers of British Columbia
Rivers of Yukon
Liard Country